Refractive index contrast, in an optical waveguide, such as an optical fiber, is a measure of the relative difference in refractive index of the core and cladding. The criterion n2 < n1 must be satisfied in order to sustain a guided mode by total internal reflection. Normal optical fibers, constructed of different glasses, have very low refractive index contrast (Δ<<1) and hence are weakly-guiding. The weak guiding will cause a greater portion of the cross-sectional Electric field profile to reside within the cladding (as evanescent tails of the guided mode) as compared to strongly-guided waveguides. Integrated optics can make use of higher core index to obtain Δ>1  allowing light to be efficiently guided around corners on the micro-scale, where popular high-Δ material platform is silicon-on-insulator. High-Δ allows sub-wavelength core dimensions and so greater control over the size of the evanescent tails. The most efficient low-loss optical fibers require low Δ to minimise losses to light scattered outwards.

References

Fiber optics
Refraction